Villazón is one of 28 parishes (administrative divisions) in Salas, a municipality within the province and autonomous community of Asturias, in northern Spain.

Villages and hamlets
Allence 
Arrojo (Arroxu)
Espinedo (Espinéu)
Figares
Grigú 
La Calzada 
Llamas
Lorís (Llourís)
Monteagudo (Monteagudu)
Quintana 
Rabadiello (Rabadiellu)
Villacarisme 
Villampero (Villampeiru) 
Villarraba

References

Parishes in Salas